Yue Chi-ming (10 December 1944 – 10 November 2022) was a Hong Kong actor and singer.

Life and career 
Born in Chenghai,  Shantou, Chi-ming started his career as a singer in the 1960s, and in 1976 he was put under contract as an actor by the TVB broadcaster, making his acting debut in the TV-series Huānlè jīn xiāo ("Happy Golden Night"). In 1986 he left the showbusiness and moved with his family to Vancouver; returned to Hong Kong in 1997, he successfully reprised his career, specializing in roles of Teochew people, eunuchs and elder characters.

Yue died of complications of a stroke on 10 November 2022, at the age of 78.

References

External links 
 
 Yue Chi-ming at Hong Kong Movie Database

1944 births
2022 deaths
Hong Kong male film actors
Hong Kong male singers
Hong Kong male television actors